"The 43 Antarean Dynasties" is a science fiction short story by American writer Mike Resnick, originally published in the December 1997 issue of  Asimov's Science Fiction.  It won the 1998 Hugo Award for Best Short Story. The story itself can be considered as a science fictional spin on the study of postcolonialism.

Plot summary
Hermes, a native and cynical insectoid tour guide shows a family of three visiting humans around the capital city of his home planet Antares.  As he escorts the three visitors around he is annoyed by their insensitive actions, especially as his fares refuse to feel sorry for the violence and destruction the previous human invasions have caused for Antareans, and saddened by what has become of his own culture.

References

External links 
 

1997 short stories
Short stories by Mike Resnick
Hugo Award for Best Short Story winning works
Works originally published in Asimov's Science Fiction